Line 2 of the Lanzhou Metro is a subway line under construction in Lanzhou running from  to , has 9 stations and is  long.

History
Line 2 was planned to start construction at the end of 2015. It will run from Yanbai Bridge to Dongfanghong Square, all within Chengguan District. The line have 2 transfer stations to Line 1, at Wulipu station and Dongfanghong Square station. The line will open in 2022.

In December 2017, tunnel boring for the second line commenced.

Opening timeline

Stations

References

02
Rail transport in Gansu